The 2011 French presidential election was held on 22 April and 6 May 2011 and marked the end of Nicolas Sarkozy's presidency. The Socialist Party candidate, François Hollande, defeated the incumbent President Sarkozy and became the first left-wing President of the Fifth Republic.

The first round of voting saw a record turnout of 80.7%, with Sarkozy taking 27.2% of the vote and Hollande taking 28.6%. This marked the first time since 1965 that an incumbent president had failed to win the first round. The second round, held on 6 May, saw a significantly lower turnout of 79.5%, with Hollande taking 51.6% of the vote and Sarkozy taking 48.4%. 

Hollande's victory was widely seen as a sign of the French people's discontent with Sarkozy's term in office. He had been criticized for his perceived pro-business and pro-rich policies, as well as his personal life, which was widely seen as too flashy for a head of state. In addition, the global economic crisis had caused an increase in unemployment and public debt, leading to an overall sense of dissatisfaction with the government.

Hollande promised to bring about a more equitable society by increasing taxes on the wealthy, creating jobs and reviving the economy. He also proposed a new law which would reduce the power of the President and create a more transparent government. He was inaugurated as President on 15 May 2011, and his term ended in 2017.

The election of Hollande marked a shift away from the neoliberal policies of the Fifth Republic and towards a more progressive and left-leaning government. This was reflected in the 2017 presidential election, in which Emmanuel Macron, the leader of the En Marche! (On the Move!) party, was elected. Macron's victory was seen as a continuation of Hollande's policies, as he promised to continue the reforms started by his predecessor.

Despite his critics, Hollande's term in office was seen as a success by many, as he managed to bring about a more equitable society, reduce unemployment and create jobs. He also helped to revive the French economy and reduce public debt. As a result, his legacy will be remembered as one of the most successful presidents in French history.

The events from the year 2011 in France are mentioned below:

Incumbents
 President: Nicolas Sarkozy 
 Prime Minister: François Fillon

Events

January 
 30 January – France win the 2011 World Men's Handball Championship after defeating Denmark.

March
 20 March and 27 March – 2011 French cantonal elections

June
 June – International Institute of Nuclear Energy is officially inaugurated.

November
 6 November – 7 November – about 7,500 homes in the departments of Var and Alpes-Maritimes lost internet or phone service due to floods in Europe.

General
The penetration rate of the mobile phone in French Republic is from around 96-97% to 100-101%.

Ongoing

Births 
 19 October – Giulia Sarkozy, daughter of Nicolas Sarkozy and Carla Bruni

Deaths 

 17 January – Jean Dutourd, novelist (born 1920)
 3 February
Maria Schneider, actress (born 1952)
Édouard Glissant, writer, poet and literary critic (born 1928)
 6 February – Andrée Chedid, Egyptian-born poet and novelist (born 1920)
 15 February – François Nourissier, journalist and writer (born 1927)
 23 February – Jean Lartéguy, writer, journalist, and former soldier (born 1920)
 28 February – Annie Girardot, actress (born 1931)
 25 March – Jean Royer, politician, former Minister, and former Mayor of Tours (born 1920)
 24 April – Marie-France Pisier, Indochinese-born actress (born 1944)
 22 November – Danielle Mitterrand, activist and widow of François Mitterrand (born 1924)
 25 December – Christophe Laigneau, footballer (Stade Lavallois) (born 1965)

References

Links

2010s in France